Langeberg Municipality (before 28 August 2009, Breede River/Winelands Local Municipality) is a local municipality located within the Cape Winelands District Municipality in the Western Cape province of South Africa.  As of 2011 it had a population of 97,724. Its municipality code is WC026.

Geography 
The Langeberg mountains run from northwest to southeast through the centre of the municipality, and the Breede River flows in the same direction south of the Langeberg. The Riviersonderend Mountains form the southern boundary of the municipality and the Koega Mountains form the northern boundary. It abuts on the Breede Valley Municipality to the northwest, the Laingsburg and Kannaland Municipalities to the northeast, the Swellendam Municipality to the southeast, and the Theewaterskloof Municipality to the southwest.

According to the 2011 census the municipality has a population of 97,724 people in 25,125 households. Of this population, 70.3% describe themselves as "Coloured", 16.3% as "Black African", and 12.3% as "White". The first language of 82.5% of the population is Afrikaans, while 10.7% speak Xhosa, 3.1% speak English and 1.3% speak Sotho.

The largest town in the municipality is Robertson, which as of 2011 has a population of 27,715. Montagu (pop. 15,176) is situated on the northeastern side of the Langeberg at the entrance to the Cogmanskloof gorge, while Ashton (pop. 13,325), the site of the municipal headquarters, is situated on the other side of the mountains at the gorge's exit. Bonnievale (pop. 9,092) is on the Breede River downstream from Robertson and Ashton, and McGregor (pop. 3,125) is south of Robertson in the foothills of the Riviersonderend Mountains.

History 
At the end of the apartheid era, the area that is today the Langeberg Municipality formed part of the Breërivier Regional Services Council (RSC). The towns of Robertson, Montagu, Ashton, Bonnievale and McGregor were governed by municipal councils elected by their white residents. The coloured residents of these towns were governed by management committees subordinate to the white councils. Nkqubela and Zolani were governed by town councils established under the Black Local Authorities Act, 1982.

While the negotiations to end apartheid were taking place a process was established for local authorities to agree on voluntary mergers. In January 1993, the Municipality of McGregor and the McGregor Management Committee merged into a single municipal council.

After the national elections of 1994 a process of local government transformation began, in which negotiations were held between the existing local authorities, political parties, and local community organisations. As a result of these negotiations, the existing local authorities were dissolved and transitional local councils (TLCs) were created for each town and village.
 Montagu TLC replaced the Municipality of Montagu and Montagu Management Committee in October 1994.
 Robertson TLC replaced the Municipality of Robertson, Robertson Management Committee and Nkqubela Town Council in November 1994.
 Ashton TLC replaced the Municipality of Ashton, Ashton Management Committee and Zolani Town Council in January 1995.
 Bonnievale TLC replaced the Municipality of Bonnievale and Bonnievale Management Committee in January 1995.
 McGregor TLC replaced the Municipality of McGregor in January 1995.
The transitional councils were initially made up of members nominated by the various parties to the negotiations, until May 1996 when elections were held. At these elections the Breërivier District Council was established, replacing the Breërivier RSC. Transitional representative councils (TRCs) were also elected to represent rural areas outside the TLCs on the District Council; the area that was to become Breede Valley Municipality was covered by the Wynland TRC.

At the local elections of December 2000 the TLCs and TRCs were dissolved and the Breede River/Winelands Municipality was established as a single local authority. At the same election the Breërivier District Council was also dissolved and replaced by the Boland District Municipality. In 2009 it was renamed the Langeberg Municipality. When District Management Areas were abolished in 2011, the boundary of the municipality was extended to include the sparsely populated region northeast of Montagu, which had formerly been part of a DMA.

Politics

The municipal council consists of twenty-three members elected by mixed-member proportional representation. Twelve councillors are elected by first-past-the-post voting in twelve wards, while the remaining eleven are chosen from party lists so that the total number of party representatives is proportional to the number of votes received. In the election of 1 November 2021 no party won a majority of seats on the council. The DA then formed a majority coalition with the Freedom Front Plus (FF+) to govern the municipality.

The following table shows the results of the 2021 election.

References

External links
 Official website
 Breede River/Winelands Local Municipality on the Western Cape Government website

Local municipalities of the Cape Winelands District Municipality